This is a list of bridges and viaducts in Angola, including those for pedestrians and vehicular traffic.

Major road and railway bridges 
This table presents the structures with spans greater than 100 meters (non-exhaustive list).

Notes and references 
 

 Others references

See also 

 Transport in Angola
 Trans-African Highway network
 Rail transport in Angola
 Geography of Angola
 List of rivers of Angola

Further reading 
 

Angola
 
Bridges
Bridges